The 2013 División Profesional season (officially the 2013 Copa TIGO- Visión Banco for sponsorship reasons) was the 79th season of top-flight professional football in Paraguay.

Teams

Torneo Apertura
The Campeonato de Apertura, also the Copa TIGO-Visión Banco for sponsorship reasons, was the 108º official championship of the Primera División, called "Don Osvaldo Domínguez Dibb", and was the first championship of the 2013 season. It began on February 9 and ended on June 30.

Standings

Results

Attendances

Topscorers

Torneo Clausura
The Campeonato de Clausura, also the Copa TIGO-Visión Banco for sponsorship reasons, was the 109º official championship of the Primera División, and was the second championship of the 2013 season.

Standings

Results

Attendances

Topscorers

Aggregate table
In 2013, Paraguay have seven slots in international cups (three in the Copa Libertadores de America and four in the Copa Sudamericana). These seven slots will be filled by five teams.
For the 2014 Copa Libertadores, the champions of the Apertura and Clausura tournaments qualify automatically. The third representative (going into the first round play-off) is the best placed non-champion from the cumulative table of both the Apertura and Clausura.
For the 2014 Copa Sudamericana, the champion (Apertura or Clausura) with the better Apertura and Clausura cumulatives qualify, with the 4th, 5th, 6th best placed teams from the Apertura and Clausura cumulatives.

Relegation
Relegations is determined at the end of the season by computing an average of the number of points earned per game over the past three seasons. The two teams with the lowest average is relegated to the División Intermedia for the following season.

See also
2013 in Paraguayan football

External links
APF's official website 
Season rules 
2013 season on RSSSF

Paraguay
1
Paraguayan Primera División seasons